Dedačov is a village and municipality in Humenné District in the Prešov Region of north-east Slovakia.

History
In historical records the village was first mentioned in 1543.

Geography
The municipality lies at an altitude of 222 metres and covers an area of 5.75 km2.
It has a population of about 172 people.

References

External links
 

Villages and municipalities in Humenné District
Zemplín (region)